Victoria Rodríguez and Bibiane Schoofs were the defending champions, but Rodríguez chose not to participate this year.

Natela Dzalamidze and Veronika Kudermetova won the title, defeating Schoofs and Barbora Štefková in the final, 6–4, 7–6(7–4).

Seeds

Draw

References

External links
Main Draw

Mumbai Open - Doubles
Sport in Mumbai
Tennis in India
2018 in Indian tennis